Isfahan is a constituency of Isfahan Province for the Islamic Consultative Assembly.

Elections

10th term

References 

Electoral districts of Iran